Bassas de Pedro, also known as Manjappar or Pedro Bank, is a submerged bank or sunken atoll belonging to the Amindivi Subgroup of islands of the Union Territory of Lakshadweep, India, with a distance of  south of the city of Delhi. .

Geography
It is also one of the northernmost features, second only to Cora Divh. Bassas de Pedro, Cora Divh and Sesostris Bank, all submerged, form the north of Lakshadweep. Bassas de Pedro stretches over 130 km from 12°31'N to 13°41'N, in the shape of an arch open to the east. Its width ranges from 15 km in the north to 33 km in the south. Its southern end is 63 km east of North Cay of Cherbaniani Reef, the closest land feature.

There are no emergent cays or islands. The general depth ranges from 46 to 50 meters, with extremes between 16.4 and 73 meters. The bank is steep-to, smooth with minor undulations in topography, and composed of sand, shells, and decayed coral. The water on the bank is not discolored.

Administration
The bank belongs to the township of Chetlat Island of Aminidivi Tehsil.

References

External links

Lagoon sizes

Undersea banks of Lakshadweep
Reefs of India
Underwater diving sites in India
Reefs of the Indian Ocean